Not Much Force is a 1915 American silent comedy film featuring Oliver Hardy.

Cast
 Julian Reed as Sarsfield O'Toole
 Lou Gorey as Mrs. O'Toole
 Jean Dumar as Mabel O'Toole
 Raymond McKee as Pat McNat
 Dallas Welford as A Burglar
 Oliver Hardy as City Councilman (as O.N. Hardy)
 Caroline Rankin as Malinda

See also
 List of American films of 1915
 Oliver Hardy filmography

External links

1915 films
1915 short films
American silent short films
American black-and-white films
1915 comedy films
Silent American comedy films
American comedy short films
1910s American films